Mini Cooper may refer to:

Cars of the original Mini series called the "Mini Cooper", made by the British Motor Corporation and its successors 1961–1971, and 1990–2000
Cars of the Mini (marque), including a number of different models produced by BMW since 2000 with the "Mini Cooper" title:
Mini Hatch, first introduced in early 2000, second generation from 2006, third from 2014
Mini Clubman (2007–Present)
Mini Countryman
Mini Coupé and Roadster
Mini Paceman

See also
Cooper Car Company